Decarthria boricua is a species of beetle in the family Cerambycidae. It was discovered by entomologist Julio Micheli in 2003. It is endemic to Puerto Rico.

References

Cyrtinini
Beetles described in 2003